Édon is a commune in the Charente department in southwestern France.

Geography
The Lizonne (locally called Nizonne) forms the commune's southeastern border.

Population

See also
Communes of the Charente department

References

Communes of Charente